This is a list of members of the Victorian Legislative Council between 1931 and 1934. As half of the Legislative Council's terms expired at each triennial election, half of these members were elected at the 1928 triennial election with terms expiring in 1934, while the other half were elected at the 1931 triennial election with terms expiring in 1937.

 In October 1931, William McCann, Country MLC for North Western Province, resigned to contest the seat of Wimmera at the 1931 federal election. Country candidate Henry Pye won the resulting by-election in March 1932.

Sources
 Re-member (a database of all Victorian MPs since 1851). Parliament of Victoria.

Members of the Parliament of Victoria by term
20th-century Australian politicians